Halil İbrahim Sönmez (born 1 October 1990) is a Turkish professional footballer who plays as a winger for Iğdır.

Career
In 2015-16 season, Sönmez clocked in at 35 km/h against Akhisar Belediyespor in the match's 83rd minute with 70 meters run. He became one of top 10 fastest footballers in the world, behind Arjen Robbenat 37 km/h and Gareth Bale at 36.9 km/h.

References

External links
 

1990 births
People from Yomra
Living people
Turkish footballers
Association football wingers
Trabzonspor footballers
Trabzon İdmanocağı players
Gebzespor footballers
Ünyespor footballers
Konyaspor footballers
1922 Konyaspor footballers
Çaykur Rizespor footballers
İstanbulspor footballers
Menemenspor footballers
Süper Lig players
TFF First League players
TFF Second League players
TFF Third League players